Pico Alto (English: High Peak) is the highest mountain in the Brazilian state of Ceará, reaching . It is located in the city of Guaramiranga, and is part of the Maciço de Baturité.

References 

Mountains of Brazil
Landforms of Ceará
Highest points of Brazilian states